Tropical Storm Beryl made landfall just south of the Mexico–United States border in mid-August 2000, causing minimal damage. The second named storm of the 2000 Atlantic hurricane season, Beryl originated from a tropical wave near the African coastline. Tracking westward, the wave failed to organize substantially until entering the Bay of Campeche, at which time it developed into a tropical storm. Beryl rapidly deepened while in the Gulf of Mexico, and it initially was forecast to strengthen to a hurricane under favorable conditions for development. Instead, Beryl remained at moderate tropical storm intensity and failed to intensify any further. One death was reported in Mexico due to drowning. Otherwise, no significant damage was reported associated with Beryl, as it affected a sparsely populated area of Mexico.

Meteorological history 

A tropical wave emerged from the African coast with a closed circulation on August 3. It tracked westward across the tropical waters of the Atlantic Ocean and broke into two distinct parts, the northern portion eventually became Hurricane Alberto. The southern portion continued to track westward into the Caribbean Sea, while producing little or no deep convection. The wave reached Mexico's Yucatán Peninsula on August 12, and only then did deep convection redevelop, mostly due to diurnal heating. The wave emerged over the Bay of Campeche early on August 13 as a large area of low pressure. The wave was upgraded to Tropical Depression Five later that day, based on satellite intensity estimates and an observation from an Air Force Reserve reconnaissance aircraft. Six hours after developing, the depression was forecast to strengthen into a hurricane early on August 16 due to the warm waters of the Gulf of Mexico and little wind shear to inhibit development.

The tropical depression traveled to the northwest across the southwest Gulf of Mexico. It strengthened rapidly, and there was evidence of deep convection as it passed over warm waters. Six hours later, the storm accelerated to near , meaning that landfall would happen sooner than expected, preventing the time for Beryl to strengthen to a hurricane. The lack of intensification could be due to moderate wind shear and entrainment over the Gulf of Mexico. Tropical Storm Beryl continued to track to the northwest toward the Rio Grande Valley area in the southern portion of the U.S. state of Texas. Beryl was downgraded to a tropical depression about five hours after landfall. The Brownsville radar showed that the circulation center of the storm became elongated parallel to the mountain ranges of northeastern Mexico, so the system was no longer declared a tropical depression late on August 15, while located near Monterrey.

Preparations 

The National Hurricane Center began issuing hurricane warnings early on August 14, anticipating that Beryl would reach hurricane strength. The warnings were issued along the Texas coast from Baffin Bay to the United States–Mexico border. The Government of Mexico issued hurricane warnings from the borderline south to La Pesca. The hurricane warnings issued stretched for  along the coast. Mexico also issued a tropical storm warning south of La Pesca to Tampico. Thousands of residents in coastal areas of southern Texas and northern Mexico were asked to pay attention to the hurricane warnings and to move towards higher ground. The National Weather Service warned the cities of Cameron and Kenedy, and Willacy County in southern Texas that severe flooding is the deadliest threat associated with the storm. In low-lying rural areas near the mouth of the Rio Grande, an estimated 20,000 residents were urged to seek shelter, as the inadequate drainage in these areas make them in danger to severe flooding. The National Weather Service also warned of possible tornadoes forming when associated with thunderstorms and tropical storm generated winds. Authorities in southern Texas filled 20,000 sandbags along the shores, and closed government offices. Residents nailed plywood on windows, parks were temporarily closed, and documents were transferred to waterproof storage areas.

The warnings remained in effect for twelve hours, then they were discontinued north of Port Mansfield in Texas. The hurricane warning was downgraded to a tropical storm warning in all areas between Port Mansfield southwards to Tampico. It was predicted the rains from Beryl could produce dangerous flash floods and mudslides over the mountainous areas of Mexico. When Beryl made landfall early on August 15, all warnings were discontinued in Texas. All warnings issued in the Government of Mexico were discontinued six hours later when Beryl was downgraded to a tropical depression.

Impact 

Beryl made landfall in a sparsely populated region of northeast Mexico, so no official reports of tropical storm force winds were recorded. Cloud cover and rainfall resulted with cool high temperatures in southern Texas. Brownsville had a high temperature of 84˚F (28.9˚C) on August 15. This broke the record for the coolest maximum temperature in Brownsville for August 15; the previous record was  set in 1881.

In Mexico a rainfall total of  within a period of 24 hours was measured in San Gabriel, Tamaulipas. Residents from two low-lying fishing villages were evacuated from the state of Tamaulipas and taken to extemporaneous shelters at schools and a sports complex. One drowning death was reported in northeast Mexico, caused by the extensive flooding from Beryl's heavy rains. Officials declared fifteen municipalities in Tamaulipas a disaster area. The total damage in Mexico was estimated to be $254,000 (2000 MXN, $27,400 2000 USD, $34,000 2008 USD).

See also 

 Other storms of the same name

References

External links 

 National Hurricane Center's archive on Tropical Storm Beryl
 National Hurricane Center's Tropical Cyclone Report on Tropical Storm Beryl
 Hydrometeorological Prediction Center's Rainfall Page for Tropical Storm Beryl
 Track of Beryl from Unisys

2000 Atlantic hurricane season
Atlantic tropical storms
Atlantic hurricanes in Mexico
Hurricanes in Texas
Beryl